is a former Japanese football player.

Playing career
Watanabe was born in Shizuoka Prefecture on April 10, 1974. After graduating from Waseda University, he joined J1 League club Kashiwa Reysol in 1997. He played many matches as right side midfielder from 1998 and the club won the champions 1999 J.League Cup. In 2000, he became a regular player as right side midfielder. The club also won the 3rd place in 1999 and 2000 J1 League. In 2004, he moved to Gamba Osaka. He played many matches as right side back and right side midfielder and the club won the champions 2005 J1 League first league champions in the club history. The club also won the 2nd place 2005 J.League Cup. In 2006, he moved to J2 League club Yokohama FC. However he could not play at all in the match and retired end of 2006 season.

Club statistics

References

External links

J.League

1974 births
Living people
Waseda University alumni
Association football people from Shizuoka Prefecture
Japanese footballers
J1 League players
J2 League players
Kashiwa Reysol players
Gamba Osaka players
Yokohama FC players
Association football defenders